Portrait of Isabella of Portugal was a betrothal painting  by the early Netherlandish artist Jan van Eyck, one of his earliest works and now lost, known only from copies. It dates to his 1428-29 visit to Portugal on behalf of Philip the Good, when he was sent as part of an embassy to evaluate the then 30-year-old Isabella's suitability as a bride for Philip.

Commission

Van Eyck was tasked by Philip the Good with bringing back two (mostly likely a pair were painted to increase the probability that one would make it back to the Netherlands) faithful representations of her likeness for the duke to evaluate.

Because Portugal was ridden with plague, their court was itinerant and the Dutch party met them at the out of way castle of Aviz. Van Eyck spent nine months there, returning successfully to the Netherlands with Isabella as a bride to be; the couple married on Christmas Day of 1429.

The portrait was executed around the time the preliminary marriage agreement was drawn up, to be sent to Philip along with the document of agreement. In this it was intended as eyewitness testimony to the "person of the princess", providing independent verification of her identity when she later travelled to Philip in Burgundy.

Description

Portrait of Isabella of Portugal is especially notable for the forward way in which she places her hand over the faux stone parapet. With this gesture Isabella extends her presence out of the pictorial space and into that of the viewer. This illusionistic motif was later developed in his London Léal Souvenir, where the subject's arm rests on the painting's lower left frame as if the subject had just suddenly and informally arrived to the sitting and casually positioned herself. This conceit was later and most famously emulated by Petrus Christus's Portrait of a Carthusian'''s which placed a fly perched on the faux center lower border of his canvas. Van Eyck had already gone further than this however, and has in this portrait created a number of illusionistic perspectives.

From surviving copies it can be deduced that apart from the actual oak frame there were two other 'painted on' frames, one of which was lettered with gothic inscription to the top, while a faux stone parapet provided support for her hands to rest upon.

Van Eyck painted a second portrait during his visit to Portugal, his 1428 Portrait of a Man with a Blue Chaperon. Art historians tend to look to this work to deduce how the Isabella portrait may have looked. The Blue Hood painting is rendered in a miniaturist scale, presumably so as to make it easier to ship back to Bruges, so it is reasonable to assume the future Queen's portrait was of much the same scale.

Although the original has been lost and is today known only from a few copies, van Eyck was a renowned and widely copied artist at the time and its probable influence can be seen in paintings of the queen by Rogier van der Weyden as well as in a depiction by an unknown northern artist of the mid-15th century, although both works show Isabella at a much older age. From a copy by an unknown follower, we can see that Isabella is shown directly gazing at the viewer, a highly daring and intimate pose for a betrothal portrait. Although her look is suitably coy, it is obviously intended to be alluring.

References

Notes

Sources
 Bauman, Guy. "Early Flemish Portraits 1425–1525". The Metropolitan Museum of Art Bulletin, Vol. 43, no. 4, Spring, 1986
 Pächt, Otto. Van Eyck and the Founders of Early Netherlandish Painting. 1999. London: Harvey Miller Publishers. 
 Richardson, Carol. Locating Renaissance Art: Renaissance Art Reconsidered. Yale University Press, 2007. 
 Seidel, Linda. "The Value of Verisimilitude in the Art of Jan Van Eyck". "Yale French Studies"; Contexts: Style and Values in Medieval Art and Literature'', 1991.

Portraits by Jan van Eyck
15th-century portraits
Lost paintings
Portraits of women